The Ministry of Environment (is a department of the Government of Armenia with responsibility for environmental protection and natural heritage.

History 
It was created as the Ministry of Nature and Environment Protection following Armenia's independence in 1991, and was subsequently renamed as the Ministry of Nature Protection and Lithosphere in 1995. Later, it was renamed Ministry of Nature Protection. It is also oftentimes referred to as the Ministry of Ecology.

The current Minister of Environment is Hakob Simidyan.

From 1997, officials at the Ministry have reported to the international Convention on Biological Diversity (CBD). In 1999, the combined work of eight groups of specialists resulted in a "First National Report on Biodiversity of Armenia" and a "Biodiversity Strategy and Action Plan", which were prepared in line with CBD guidelines and the priority development goals of Armenia.

See also 

Lake Sevan
List of protected areas of Armenia
Sevan National Park

References

External links
 
 Ministry of Environment on Facebook

Environmental organizations based in Armenia
Government ministries of Armenia